The International Suppliers Network is a system which logs and tracks vendors. Major companies such as General Motors often use the ISN to establish the "trustworthy" status of a new vendor. The ISN also allows companies to import a validated version of a vendor's details directly into their own procurement system.

Companies which have an ISN Profile automatically are issued with an ISN Rating, which is a rating of a company's stability and ability to manage its business. This made the ISN profile a good International identifier. General ratings range from -10 to 10, with a default value of 1. This is based on a number of key criteria, such as financial stability, and trading history performance.

The ISN is regulated by the International Charter organization.

External links 
ISN Registration

Credit rating agencies